Kristaps Sotnieks (born January 29, 1987) is a Latvian professional ice-hockey defenseman. He currently plays for Dinamo Riga in the Kontinental Hockey League (KHL).

Playing career
In his first season in senior hockey in 2004/05 Sotnieks mostly played for the reserves squad of HK Riga 2000 which played in the Latvian hockey league, however he also played 5 matches in the main team of Riga 2000 in Belarusian Extraliga. Due to the 2004–05 NHL lockout the squad of Riga 2000 was quite impressive that year, including NHLers Kārlis Skrastiņš, Sergejs Žoltoks and Darby Hendrickson, thus it was especially tough for youngsters like Sotnieks to get through on the main team.  In 2005 Sotnieks played in five matches for Latvia at the U18 World Championships.

The next season Sotnieks was already a regular player in the main team of Riga 2000 which won bronze medals in the Belarusian Extraliga. In 42 matches he scored one goal, gave 4 assists and got 10 penalty minutes. In 2006 Sotnieks represented Latvia at the 2006 World Junior Ice Hockey Championships in Canada, earning 2 points for assists as Latvia was relegated to Division I.

The next two years Riga 2000 played only in the Latvian hockey league with Sotnieks as one of the most reliable defenders on the team. In 2005, 2006 and 2007 as a member of Riga 2000 Sotnieks won Latvian league titles.

When Dinamo Riga was formed in 2008 Sotnieks wasn't among the players who were expected to be playing regularly for the side which included former NHLers like Duvie Westcott and Filip Novák, as well as a whole selection of players who had played for Latvia national ice hockey team at several world championships - Atvars Tribuncovs, Rodrigo Laviņš, Guntis Galviņš, Krišjānis Rēdlihs, Oļegs Sorokins and Agris Saviels. Thus Sotnieks was expected to be a leading defender for HK Riga 2000 (the farm club of Dinamo) playing in the Belarusian league. However, Sotnieks became a regular for Dinamo. As of 17 February 2009, he has played 43 matches for Dinamo in the KHL, scoring two goals.

International play
In February 2009 Sotnieks played for Latvia national ice hockey team in the Qualification to 2010 Winter Olympics, scoring two assists in three games and earning Latvia a qualification spot at the Olympics.

Career statistics

Regular season and playoffs

International

References

External links
 

1987 births
Living people
Dinamo Riga players
Ice hockey players at the 2010 Winter Olympics
Ice hockey players at the 2014 Winter Olympics
HC Lada Togliatti players
Latvian ice hockey defencemen
Olympic ice hockey players of Latvia
Ice hockey people from Riga